Flavobacterium cheniae  is a Gram-negative and rod-shaped bacterium from the genus of Flavobacterium which has been isolated from sediments from the Guanting Reservoir from Beijing in China.

References

External links
Type strain of Flavobacterium cheniae at BacDive -  the Bacterial Diversity Metadatabase

cheniae
Bacteria described in 2008